The 2005 Zentiva Czech Indoor Open Open was a men's tennis tournament played on indoor hard courts in Průhonice , Czech Republic, and was part of the 2005 ATP Challenger Series.

This was the third edition of the event and was held from 22 to 27 November 2005.

Lukáš Dlouhý and Igor Zelenay were the defending champions. The first decided to not partake in this edition, the second lost in semifinals to the eventual champions.

Filip Polášek and Sergiy Stakhovsky won the title at their first ever participation in the tournament, defeating James Auckland and Jasper Smit in the final with the score 6–3, 3–6, 7–6(7–5), the same of previous edition final.

Seeds

Draw

References
Main Draw

Qualifying Draw

Draws on ITF Site

Czech Indoor Open